Coelioxys rufitarsis, common name red-legged cuckoo leafcutter bee, is a species of bee in the family Megachilidae. It is native to North America.

This cuckoo bee parasitizes the nests of several other bee species, including Megachile latimanus, M. melanophoea, and M. perihirta.

References

rufit
Hymenoptera of North America
Insects of Canada
Insects of the United States
Insects described in 1854